Pauline Kwalea (born February 29, 1988 in Honiara) is a track and field sprint athlete who competes internationally for the Solomon Islands.

Kwalea represented the Solomon Islands at the 2008 Summer Olympics in Beijing. She competed at the 100 metres sprint and placed 9th in her heat without advancing to the second round. She ran the distance in a time of 13.28 seconds.

At the 2012 Summer Olympics, she set a new personal best time of 12.90 although she did not advance to the quarterfinals in the Women's 100m event.

Achievements

References

External links
 
Sports reference biography

1988 births
Living people
Solomon Islands female sprinters
Olympic athletes of the Solomon Islands
Athletes (track and field) at the 2008 Summer Olympics
Athletes (track and field) at the 2012 Summer Olympics
People from Honiara
Olympic female sprinters